The 2013 Netball Superleague season was the eighth season of the Netball Superleague. The league was won by Team Bath who defeated Celtic Dragons in the grand final. 2013 used a three phases format similar to 2012.

Teams
During the close season Northern Thunder changed their name to Manchester Thunder.

Regular season

Phase 1

Phase 2

Playoffs
4th/5th place play-off

Semi-finals

Grand Final

References

 
2013
2013 in English netball
2013 in Welsh women's sport